Evgeni Striganov (born 23 March 1982 in Tallinn) is an Estonian ice dancer. With partner Marina Timofejeva, he is the 2003 & 2004 Estonian national champion. They were five time competitors at the World Junior Figure Skating Championships, with the highest placement of 17th in 2003. They placed 22nd at the 2003 European Figure Skating Championships and 26th at the 2003 World Figure Skating Championships. They were coached by Lea Rand, the mother of fellow Estonian ice dancers Kristjan and Taavi Rand.

References

External links
 Tracings.net profile

Estonian male ice dancers
Figure skaters from Tallinn
Estonian people of Russian descent
Living people
1982 births